The Regional Council of Auvergne-Rhône-Alpes is the deliberative assembly of the Auvergne-Rhône-Alpes region in southeast-central France. Laurent Wauquiez of The Republicans (LR) has presided over the body since 4 January 2016, following regional elections on 6 and 13 December 2015. The Regional Council of Auvergne-Rhône-Alpes succeeded the Regional Council of Auvergne and Regional Council of Rhône-Alpes.

History
The Regional Council of Auvergne-Rhône-Alpes was created by the act on the delimitation of regions, regional and departmental elections and amending the electoral calendar of 16 January 2015, which went into effect on 1 January 2016 and merged the Regional Council of Auvergne and Regional Council of Rhône-Alpes, consisting of 47 and 156 regional councillors, respectively, into a single body with 204 regional councillors, following regional elections on 6 and 13 December 2015.

Seat 
As Lyon was designated as the capital of the new region, the official meeting place of the regional council of Auvergne-Rhône-Alpes is at the Hôtel de Région located in the district of La Confluence in the 2nd arrondissement of Lyon at 1 esplanade François Mitterrand. Originally built at a cost of €147.1 million as the seat of the regional council of Rhône-Alpes, the construction of the building was approved by the regional council on 7 April 2005, followed by a European-level architecture competition from November 2005 to September 2006, the procurement of a building permit on 30 August 2007, groundbreaking on 8 July 2008, and the relocation of employees over a six-week period starting on 19 May 2011.

On 21 June 2014, the new headquarters of the regional council of Auvergne at the Hôtel de Région in Clermont-Ferrand at 59 boulevard Léon Jouhaux was officially opened, built at a cost of €81 million. The fate of the project, approved in 2007 with unanimous support, was questioned given the selection of Lyon as the capital of the new region. Although Jean-Jack Queyranne, president of the regional council of Rhône-Alpes, suggested that the merged region could alternate between the two seats, with plenary assemblies in Lyon and standing committees in Clermont-Ferrand, the idea was scrapped given the comparison to the experience of the European Parliament with its two seats in Brussels and Strasbourg. With Laurent Wauquiez, promising reduced costs, elected president of the region following the 2015 regional elections, any arrangement involving frequent travel between the two cities was definitively ruled out. The building continues to house administrative functionaries, with space rented out for associations and start-ups and serving as a venue for events and conferences in an effort to make the structure profitable. The standing committee of the regional council also occasionally meets in Clermont-Ferrand.

Election results

2015 regional election 
The current regional council was elected in regional elections on 6 and 13 December 2015, with the list of Laurent Wauquiez consisting of The Republicans (LR), the Democratic Movement (MoDem), and the Union of Democrats and Independents (UDI) securing an absolute majority of 113 seats.

Composition

Political groups 
The regional council of Auvergne-Rhône-Alpes currently consists of seven political groups.

Executive

Presidents 
Laurent Wauquiez was elected president of the regional council of Auvergne-Rhône-Alpes at its opening session in Lyon on 4 January 2016.

Vice presidents 
In addition to the president, the executive consists of 15 vice presidents and 14 advisers.

Committees 
The regional council includes 18 thematic committees with advisory roles, each composed of 38 members with a chairperson and two vice chairpersons. The comments of the thematic committees are considered by and submitted to a final vote of the standing committee or in a plenary session. The standing committee consists of the president, 15 vice presidents, and 45 members of the regional council.

References

External links 
Official website of the Auvergne-Rhône-Alpes region 

Politics of Auvergne-Rhône-Alpes
Auvergne-Rhône-Alpes